Xinjian Subdistrict is a subdistrict in Hunjiang District, Baishan, Jilin province, China. , it has 7 residential communities and one special development zone under its administration.

See also 
 List of township-level divisions of Jilin

References 

Township-level divisions of Jilin
Baishan